A folding seat is a seat that folds away so as to occupy less space. When installed on a transit bus, it makes room for a wheelchair or two. When installed on a passenger car, it provides extra seating.

In churches, it may have a projection called a misericord, which offers some support to a person standing in front when the seat is folded.

Folding seats may also be found in stadiums, arenas, theaters and auditoriums to facilitate entry and exit.

Some folding seats in rapid transit may fold-down rather than fold up.

Gallery

See also 

 Fold down seating
 Folding chair
 Folding seats in cars
 Jump seat
 List of chairs
 Rumble seat
 Seat
 Stairlift
 Swivel seat
 Turning seat

Seats
Space-saving furniture